SOMM TV is a food and wine streaming network launched in 2019 by SOMM director Jason Wise, Christina Wise, Jackson Myers, Diane Carpenter, Brian Reshefsky and Eric Esrailian.

The network has original shows including Verticals, Blind Tasting Sessions, Cellar Stories, A Closer Look, Winery Tours, Sommelier's Notebook, and educational content. They also have a library of licensed content with wine and food films.

Their flagship show Verticals, which takes viewers through the vintages that defined the winery or winemaker, premiered at the Napa Valley Film Festival in fall 2019. In 2021, SOMM TV released a documentary titled Verticals: Lafite Rothschild. The program is narrated by Baron and Saskia Rothschild.

In April 2020, the film A Chef's Voyage premiered on SOMM TV, with 100% of the profits going toward the LEE Initiative's Restaurant Workers Relief Program.

In 2021, SOMM TV released a new reality TV competition show, Sparklers In 2022, Sparklers"was nominated for a James Beard Foundation Award in the Reality or Competition Visual Media category.

In February 2022, SOMM TV premiered "Saving The Restaurant". This film follows Bobby Stuckey as he tries to help restaurants avoid closure during the pandemic.

In June 2022, "The Whole Animal" premiered on SOMM TV. The Whole Animal emphasizes that “there’s a purpose behind every part of the animal.” Director, Jason Wise used the art of butchery as the “center of the wheel in order to highlight the farmer, the chef, the restaurateurs and how animals are treated.” 

In July 2022 SOMM TV released their latest film, Auction Lot 288, the story of the world's most expensive Champagne, featuring a bottle of 1874 Perrier-Jouët. This film was featured in an article published by The Zoe Report about the most expensive bottles of wine of the year.

Previous movies from the SOMM team include SOMM, SOMM: Into the Bottle, SOMM 3, Wait for your Laugh, and The Delicacy, which premiered on the streaming service in May 2020 

SOMM TV was named by USA TODAY as one of "15 awesome gift ideas for people who love wine". It is available on all devices and smart TVs worldwide as well as the SOMM TV podcast network, which includes hosts Jason Wise, Jill Zimorski, and Shakera Jones, and can be found on all major podcast platforms.

References

Wine websites